Madeleine Howard (born 15 March 1951) is a British actress known for her role as Sarah Sugden, from 1988 to 1994 in the soap opera Emmerdale. She has also appeared in other TV programs such as The Bill, Holby City, Doctors, Howards Way and Tricia Pope in Gems.

References

External links

1951 births
British television actresses
Living people